Great Britain Ltd (also known as GBLtd) is a British nation-simulation game originally released in 1982 for the BBC Micro and ZX Spectrum. The game was written and published by Simon W Hessel.

The game provides a simple government simulation, allowing the player to manage the British economy and compete in elections every 5 years.  The player takes on the role of leader of one of the major parties, managing variables such as tax rates and welfare payments, which each year results in changes to key economic indicators such as inflation and unemployment.

These changes also impact the player's popularity, making it easier or harder to win subsequent elections.  After winning an election, the player is allowed another 5 years to manage the economy before another election is held.

External links 
 
 Sinclair User review
 Game information at GameFAQs

1982 video games
BBC Micro and Acorn Electron games
Europe-exclusive video games
Government simulation video games
Video games developed in the United Kingdom
ZX Spectrum games